Coronado may refer to:

People
 Coronado (surname)
 Francisco Vázquez de Coronado (1510–1554), Spanish explorer often referred to simply as "Coronado"
 Coronado Chávez (1807–1881), President of Honduras from 1845 to 1847

Places

United States
 Coronado Butte, a summit in the Grand Canyon, Arizona
 Coronado, California, a city
 Coronado Heights, Kansas, a hill with a public park
 Coronado, Kansas, an unincorporated community
 Coronado Cave, Arizona
 Coronado Historic Site, New Mexico
 Coronado National Forest, in Arizona and New Mexico

Mexico
 Coronado Municipality, Chihuahua, Mexico
 Coronado Islands, island group in Tijuana municipality, Baja California, Mexico
 Isla Coronado, an island and volcano in Ensenada municipality, Baja California, Mexico 
 Isla Coronados, Loreto Municipality, Baja California Sur, Mexico

Elsewhere
 Coronado, Alberta, Canada, a locality
 Vázquez de Coronado (canton), commonly shortened to Coronado, a canton in Costa Rica
 Coronado, Panama, a city
 Coronado (São Romão e São Mamede), a civil parish in Trofa, Portugal
 Coronado, Uruguay, a village in Artigas Department

Arts and entertainment
 Coronado: Stories, collection of short stories by Dennis Lehane
 Coronado (1935 film), an American comedy film
 Coronado (2003 film), a German-American adventure film
 Fender Coronado, an electric guitar

Military
 Operation Coronado, a series of military operations in the Vietnam War
 , several naval vessels
 Consolidated PB2Y Coronado, a World War II United States Navy flying boat
 Naval Base Coronado, a United States Navy base in California

Transportation
 Convair 990 Coronado, a passenger jet
 Coronado Yachts, an American sailboat manufacturer
 Freightliner Coronado, a model of truck
 Coronado Railroad, a former railroad in Arizona

Other uses
 Cisthene coronado, a moth of the family Erebidae
 Coronado High School (disambiguation)
 Coronado School (Albuquerque, New Mexico), an elementary school on the National Register of Historic Places
 Coronado Theatre, Rockford, Illinois, United States
 Coronado, an electronics brand of retailer Gamble-Skogmo

See also